The 2021 season was the 116th season of competitive football in Norway.

The season was scheduled to begin on 1 May 2021.

Men's football

League season

Promotion and relegation

Eliteserien

1. divisjon

2. divisjon

Group 1

Group 2

3. divisjon

Group 1

Group 2

Group 3

Group 4

Group 5

Group 6

4. divisjon

Norwegian Cup

Women's football

League season

Promotion and relegation

Toppserien

1. divisjon

2. divisjon

Norwegian Women's Cup

Final

UEFA competitions

UEFA Champions League

Qualifying phase and play-off round

First qualifying round

|}

UEFA Europa League

Knockout phase

Round of 32

The tournament continued from the 2020 season.

|}

Round of 16

|}

UEFA Europa Conference League

Second qualifying round 

|}

Third qualifying round 

|}

Play-off round 

|}

Group stage

Group C

UEFA Women's Champions League

2020–21

Knockout phase

Round of 16

The tournament continued from the 2020 season.

|}

2021–22

Qualifying rounds

Round 1

Semi-finals

|}

Finals

|}

Round 2

|}

National teams

Norway men's national football team

2022 FIFA World Cup qualification

Group G

Friendlies

Norway women's national football team

Friendlies

2023 FIFA Women's World Cup qualification

Group F

Notes

References

 
Seasons in Norwegian football